The next presidential election is scheduled to be held in Hungary in 2027. The President of the Republic is elected in an indirect election, by Members of Parliament. Incumbent president Katalin Novák is eligible to run for a second term.

Electoral system 
Under the current Constitution of Hungary adopted by the Fidesz–KDNP government coalition in 2011, the President of the Republic is elected via secret ballot by the Members of Parliament, no sooner than sixty but no later than thirty days before expiry of the mandate (5 years) of the previous office-holder, or if his or her mandate terminated prematurely, within thirty days of the termination. The constitution authorizes the Speaker of the National Assembly to set the date for the election.

A presidential candidate needs the written nomination of at least one-fifth of the Members of Parliament (thus about 40 MPs), who may not nominate more than one candidate. In the first round of the election, a two-thirds majority of all incumbent MPs is required to elect the president. If this condition is not fulfilled, a second round is held between the two candidates who received the highest and second highest numbers of votes in the first round. (Since 1990, there have been no more than two candidates in any presidential election.) A simple majority of the voting MPs is then sufficient.

Background 
The opposition alliance United for Hungary called for the direct election of the President of the Republic in their manifesto for the 2022 parliamentary election, which would require amending or replacing the current constitution of Hungary.

References 
 

Elections in Hungary
Future elections in Europe